Depth Charge is a game for the Apple II family of computers, created in 1978 by programmer Chris Oberth and published by The Elektrik Keyboard of Chicago, Illinois.

Game play
Like the 1977 arcade game Depthcharge that it emulates, Depth Charge puts the player in control of a small ship that drops depth charges onto passing submarines.  The ship makes three passes from right to left across the top of the screen, and four submarines at varying depths move from left to right below it.  Destroying deeper subs earns the player more points; one extra pass is awarded at 600 points another at 900 points.  The screen inverts in overtime.  Hits, misses, score and high score are displayed at the bottom of the screen.

References

1978 video games
Apple II games
Apple II-only games
Elektrik Keyboard games
Video game clones
Video games developed in the United States
Single-player video games